The Lexikon der indogermanischen Partikeln und Pronominalstämme (LIPP, "Lexicon of the Indo-European Particles and Pronominal Stems") is an etymological dictionary of the Proto-Indo-European (PIE) particles and pronouns, published in 2014. It consists of two volumes; number 1 containing an introduction, terminology, sound laws, adverbial endings, nominal suffixes, appendices, and indices, and number 2 containing the lexicon.

See also
 Proto-Indo-European particles
 Proto-Indo-European pronouns

References

External links
Pokorny PIE Data (University of Texas)
Indogermanisches Wörterbuch by Gerhard Köbler 

2014 non-fiction books
Indo-European linguistics works
Etymological dictionaries